Pietro Bernini (6 May 1562 – 29 August 1629) was an Italian sculptor. He was the father of one of the most famous artists of Baroque, Gian Lorenzo Bernini, as well as the sculptor-architect Luigi Bernini.

Biography
Bernini was born in Sesto Fiorentino, Tuscany. He moved to Naples to work on the Certosa di San Martino there, and Gian Lorenzo was born in Naples in 1598. In 1605 the family moved to Rome under the protection of Cardinal Scipione Borghese. In Rome he worked on various projects for Pope Paul V, another Borghese, including the Pauline Chapel in the Basilica of Santa Maria Maggiore.

One of Pietro Bernini's best known contributions to the city of Rome is the Fontana della Barcaccia (Fountain of the Old Boat) which resembles a beached ship and is located at the foot of the Spanish Steps.  It was commissioned by Pope Urban VIII and built in 1627.  He also contributed to the Fountain of Neptune, Naples, completed between 1600 and 1601.

Initially collaborating with his son (for example on Boy with a Dragon in 1617) but later overshadowed by his talent, the elder Bernini ended his career as an independent sculptor around 1617, evidently happy to act as his son's assistant. He died in Rome, aged 67.

Gallery

References 

Gian Lorenzo Bernini
1562 births
1629 deaths
People from Sesto Fiorentino
16th-century Italian sculptors
Italian male sculptors
17th-century Italian sculptors